Dawn of America (Spanish: Alba de América) is a 1951 Spanish historical adventure film directed by Juan de Orduña and starring Antonio Vilar, María Martín and José Suárez. The film depicts the discovery of the Americas by Christopher Columbus in the late fifteenth century.

Production
The film was made by the largest Spanish studio CIFESA. The production was conceived as a response to the 1949 British film Christopher Columbus. The British film had attempted a realist depiction of Columbus (portraying him as only partly successful, and his achievements being in spite of the Spanish monarchy). The Spanish response portrayed Columbus as a single-minded adventurer whose discovery led to the greater glory of the Spanish monarchy and the Catholic Church.

It was also designed as part of the celebrations for the 500th anniversary of the Catholic Monarchs. The film's patriotic theme was strongly backed by the Spanish State of Francisco Franco. The film was made on a comparatively large budget of ten million pesetas, part of which was supplied by the government. The film did not make a profit, partly due to its large budget and because the plot was not melodramatic enough for audience tastes. The film originally lost out on the prestigious National Interest prize to Furrows but José María García Escudero, who had made the decision, was removed and the prize was awarded to Dawn of America.

Plot 
The film narrates the adventures of Christopher Columbus (Antonio Vilar) from his stay in the Convent of La Rábida to his meeting with the Catholic Monarchs and his feat in crossing the Atlantic and reaching the shores of America, ushering in a new era in the history of mankind.

Cast
 Antonio Vilar as Cristóbal Colón
 María Martín as Beatriz
 José Suárez as Rey Fernando el Católico
 Virgilio Teixeira as Pedro de Arana
 Manuel Luna as Isaac
 Eduardo Fajardo as Gastón
 Jesús Tordesillas as Fray Juan Pérez
 Ana María Custodio as Madre de Beatriz
 José Marco Davó as Martín Alonso Pinzón
 Ernesto Vilches as Cabrero
 Alberto Romea as Cardenal Mendoza
 Nicolás D. Perchicot as Fray Antonio de Marchena
 Fernando Sancho as Pedro Salcedo
 Francisco Pierrá as Miembro de la junta
 Arturo Marín as Pedro Vázquez de la Frontera
 Antonio Casas as Juan de la Cosa
 Faustino Bretaño as Mensajero que se arrodilla
 José Jaspe as Marinero
 Vicente Soler as Conde de Quintanilla
 Carlos Díaz de Mendoza as Miembro de la junta
 Alfonso Candel
 Joaquín Pujol 
 Miguel Pastor as Pregonero
 Félix Dafauce as Villamarín
 Francisco Hernández 
 José Sepúlveda as Cristóbal Sarniento
 Francisco Arenzana as Francisco Arias
 Ramón Elías
 Rafael Arcos as Mensajero del Rey
 Francisco Bernal as Posadero
 Luis Torrecilla 
 Jacinto San Emeterio as Gonzalo de Córdoba
 Domingo Rivas as Duque de Medina
 Gary Land
 Antonio Almorós as Vicente Yáñez Pinzón
 Benito Cobeña
 Manrique Gil
 Pablo Álvarez Rubio
 Teófilo Palou as Secretario de la Corona
 Rafael Calvo Revilla as Secretario de la Corona
 Manuel Aguilera as Secretario de la Corona
 César Guzman
 Luis Rivera 
 Carmen Capdepont
 José María Labernié
 Francisco Maroto
 Luis Fernandez 
 José Riesgo as Miembro del consejo
 María Luisa D. de Velasco
 Rafael Cortés
 Amparo Rivelles as Reina Isabel la Católica

References

Bibliography
 Bentley, Bernard. A Companion to Spanish Cinema. Boydell & Brewer 2008.

External links

1951 films
Spanish adventure drama films
Spanish historical adventure films
1950s adventure drama films
1950s historical adventure films
1950s Spanish-language films
Films directed by Juan de Orduña
Films set in Madrid
Seafaring films
Films set in the 1490s
Fiction set in 1492
Cultural depictions of Christopher Columbus
Cifesa films
Films scored by Juan Quintero Muñoz
Cultural depictions of Isabella I of Castile
Cultural depictions of Spanish kings
1951 drama films
Spanish black-and-white films
1950s Spanish films